The 2023 African Para Games are to be the first edition of the African Para Games expected to be held between 3 and 12 September 2023 in Accra, Ghana.

Sports
The following competitions are to take place:

Preparations
In January 2022, president of the International Paralympic Committee Andrew Parsons visited Ghana in support of the 2023 African Para Games which are also to be held in Accra.

Branding
The logo and motto for the games, Para Sports Inspire a Better Africa, was revealed in November 2022. The games support the IPC #WalkInMyShoe initiative which aims to "break the stigma attached to Para sports" in African nations.

Participating nations
The following nations are expected to compete:

See also
2023 African Games

References

External links
National Paralympic Committee of Ghana on Twitter

 
Disabled multi-sport events
Multi-sport events in Africa
Multi-sport events